Lieutenant Colonel John Dymoke Scale DSO, OBE (born 27 December 1882) was an MI6 (SIS) agent, originally from Merthyr Tydfil in Glamorgan. He was involved in a British propaganda unit called the Anglo-Russian Commission in St Petersburg, where his responsibilities included running Mohammed Beck Hadjetlaché. Scale served in the British Indian Army and was first sent to Russia in 1912. He qualified as a Russian translator in 1913 and rejoined the 87th Punjabis in 1914. In 1916, Scale served with Stephen Alley and Oswald Rayner under Mansfield Cumming at the time of the murder of Grigori Rasputin. Whilst a captain in St Petersburg, in the weeks leading up to the killing, Scale is recorded as having met with Oswald Rayner and Felix Yusupov in the diary of their chauffeur, William Compton. Several other books and documentaries have claimed Scale's involvement in Rasputin's death, or even alleged that Scale commanded Rayner to fatally shoot him. A letter from Alley to Scale provides the best evidence of British Intelligence involvement in the murder and torture that reads:

In March 1918, Scale was an SIS bureau commander in Stockholm.

References 

1882 births
World War I spies for the United Kingdom
Year of death missing